Antigone Metaxa-Krontera (1905–1971) was a Greek writer of children's literature. She used the pseudonym, Theia Lena (Θεία Λένα, "Aunt Lena"). She also was the founder of Greece's first children's theater.

She studied theatre and first worked as an actress. In 1932, she founded the first Greek children's theatre. During the late 1930s, she established the first weekly radio programs for children in Greece. Later she performed on television, hosting a show called Kalispera paidakia (Good evening, children).

She published around 200 children's books, including 50 that she wrote herself. She published a children's encyclopedia, the first published in Greek. She also was editor for a children's newspaper which was published twice monthly.

Notes

References 

1905 births
1971 deaths
Greek children's writers
Pseudonymous women writers
Greek women writers
Greek stage actresses
Greek women children's writers
Greek television actresses
20th-century Greek actresses
20th-century Greek women writers
20th-century Greek writers
20th-century pseudonymous writers
Actresses from Athens